Masinasin is a former community in Alberta, Canada within the County of Warner No. 5.

Masinasin is a Cree name meaning 'Writing on Stone', referring to figures and writing cut in the sandstone banks of Milk River.

Climate 
Masinasin experiences a semi-arid, continental climate (Köppen climate classification BSk).

Education

The Milk River Valley School District No. 2024 was formed on August 24, 1909. The Milk River Valley school was a one room schoolhouse that once stood at township 15 - 2 - 13 - W4. Originally named Milk River Valley, the name was changed to Masinasin in 1941, when several area school districts were centralized and moved to Masinasin.

See also 
 List of communities in Alberta

References 

Ghost towns in Alberta
Localities in the County of Warner No. 5